Lipa  is a village in the administrative district of Gmina Ryczywół, within Oborniki County, Greater Poland Voivodeship, in west-central Poland.

The village has an approximate population of 500.

References

Lipa